Piero del Pollaiuolo (also spelled Pollaiolo;  in Florence – 1496 in Rome), also known as Piero Benci, was an Italian Renaissance painter from Florence. His brother was the artist Antonio del Pollaiuolo and the two frequently worked together. Their work shows both classical influences and an interest in human anatomy; reportedly, the brothers carried out dissections to improve their knowledge of the subject.

Giorgio Vasari includes a biography of Piero del Pollaiuolo in his Lives of the Most Excellent Painters, Sculptors, and Architects.

Works
Profile Portrait of a Young Woman (c. 1465) –  oil on wood
The Archangel Raphael and Tobias (c. 1465–1470)
Cardinal del Portogallo Altarpiece (1467–1668) – altarpiece
 Seven Virtues (1469–1470; six painted by Pollaiuolo):
Charity
Faith
Temperance
Prudence
Hope
Justice
Portrait of a Young Woman (c. 1470)
Apollo and Daphne (c. 1470–1480)
Portrait of Galeazzo Maria Sforza (c. 1471) – tempera on wood
Portrait of a Woman (c. 1475)
Martyrdom of Saint Sebastian (completed 1475) – oil on wood
Coronation of the Virgin (1483) – altarpiece painted in the choir of the cathedral at San Gimignano

References

External links 

Biography on the Web Gallery of Art
Extensive biography of Antonio and Piero del Pollaiuolo
Piero del Pollaiuolo at Panopticon Virtual Art Gallery
Italian Paintings: Florentine School, a Metropolitan Museum of Art collection catalog containing information about Pollaiuolo and his works (see pages 123–125; MMA #50.135.3).

1440s births
1496 deaths
Painters from Florence
Quattrocento painters
Italian male painters
Renaissance painters
15th-century Italian painters
Catholic painters
Sibling artists